Mary Peach (born 20 October 1934) is a South African-born British film and television actress, who was married to the screenwriter and director Jimmy Sangster from 1995 until his death in 2011.

Biography

Peach was born in Durban. After being nominated for a BAFTA Award as most promising newcomer for the 1959 film Room at the Top, she went on to appear on many British films and television series over the next 25 years. She starred opposite Rock Hudson in the film A Gathering of Eagles and in 1970 she appeared in the film Scrooge, a musical version of Dickens' A Christmas Carol starring Albert Finney.

She appeared as a regular in the TV series Couples, Inside Story, the 1966 BBC adaptation of The Three Musketeers, Fox and the Doctor Who serial The Enemy of the World. Amongst her other television appearances she played Colonel Tanya Smolenko, a Russian counter espionage agent in  episode "The Gadget Lovers" (1967) and starred opposite Ian McShane in Disraeli (1978).

When Diana Rigg left The Avengers in 1968, she was one of the actresses considered for the role of Steed's new assistant.

Personal life 
Peach married film producer Thomas Clyde on 18 May 1961 at the Chelsea Register Office in London. They met on the set of the 1960 film Follow That Horse!, which Clyde produced. The couple separated in the 1980s and later divorced.

Peach and Clyde had two children:

 Andrew Clyde (b. February 1963)
 Joanna Clyde (b. 1965)

She married screenwriter and director Jimmy Sangster in 1995.

Filmography

Film

Television

References

External links

1934 births
Living people
British film actresses
British television actresses
South African actresses
Actors from Durban
South African expatriates in the United Kingdom